
Ducky is a nickname and fictional character given name. It may refer to:

People 
 Princess Victoria Melita of Saxe-Coburg and Gotha (1876–1936), nicknamed "Ducky" within her family, British princess, granddaughter of Queen Victoria
 Ducky Detweiler (1919–2013), American Major League Baseball third baseman
 Elvin C. Drake (1903–1988), American college track and field coach and trainer
 Dale Hawerchuk (born 1963), Canadian retired National Hockey League centre
 Ducky Hemp (1862-1923), American Major League Baseball player and manager
 Ducky Holmes (1869–1932), American Major League Baseball outfielder
 Ducky Holmes (catcher) (1883–1945), American Major League Baseball catcher
 Joe Medwick (1911–1975), American Major League Baseball left fielder
 Clarence Nash (1904–1985), longtime voice of Donald Duck
 Ducky Pond (1902-1982), American college football and baseball player and football coach
 Ducky Schofield (born 1935), American Major League Baseball infielder
 Don Williams (animator), Disney animator and illustrator
 Ducky Yount (1885-1970), American Major League Baseball pitcher

Fictional characters 
 Ducky (The Land Before Time), a Saurolophus in The Land Before Time film series
 Ducky Mallard, medical examiner in the TV series NCIS, played by David McCallum
 Ducky, a character in the film Toy Story 4
 Ducky, a Splicer model in the video game BioShock

See also
 Rubber ducky, a toy shaped like a stylised duck
 Duckie (disambiguation)
 Duck (disambiguation)

Lists of people by nickname